The Glassheart Tour was the second headlining concert tour by English singer Leona Lewis. It was launched in support of her third studio album, Glassheart (2012). Announced on 8 October 2012, with an initial run of sixteen dates in the United Kingdom, the Glassheart Tour was extended to include five dates in Germany and one in Switzerland. English singer-songwriter Ryan Keen served as the support act. It marks the first time that Lewis has performed material in Europe as part of a headline tour; her previous tour The Labyrinth (2010), only visited the UK.

Lewis was inspired by American hip hop artist and music producer Kanye West's style of performance and noted English playwright William Shakespeare as inspiration for the tour. Lewis performed the set list with her band which consisted mostly of a string quartet and acoustic song arrangements. It was the acoustic performances and Lewis' vocals that garnered the most praise from critics; however, there was a mixed reaction to some of the arrangements such as the reggae influences on "Better in Time". Critics were also divided over the lack of diversity from previous live performances though Lewis' stage presence was commended.

Background and development 
Lewis released her third studio album Glassheart on 12 October 2012, almost a year after the original release date of November 2011. The album had been conceptualised in July 2010, following Lewis' completion of her first tour, The Labyrinth. The album title Glassheart was inspired from a conversation that Lewis had with Ryan Tedder. During the conversation, Tedder asked Lewis about her past experiences with love and life in general. Lewis' response led him to the word "Glassheart." During an interview with Clyde 1 radio, Lewis said "Glassheart represents protecting your heart, yourself and protecting your emotions, its very poignant". On 8 October 2012, a week before the album's UK release, Lewis announced her supporting tour of the same name. The tour is named after the album, and although Lewis said she is not American hip hop artist and music producer Kanye West's "biggest fan", she was inspired by his tour performances where he appeared on stage alone and just "did his thing".

During an interview with Digital Spy, Lewis told Tom Eames that Glassheart has a running theme about "star-crossed lovers that can't be together", and so it was likely that this idea would feature on the tour. Lewis also cited William Shakespeare as another source of inspiration. She spent the three days of the final tour rehearsals at The Backstage Centre in Purfleet, Essex (UK). The Glassheart Tour was scheduled to visit twenty-one venues across Germany and the United Kingdom. The tour was expected to begin on 15 April in Berlin. The list had expanded from an initial sixteen to include five dates in Germany. Lewis would then proceed with UK dates beginning in Glasgow, including two dates at London's Royal Albert Hall before finishing on 18 May in Plymouth. Speaking about the tour, Lewis said "I can't wait to get out there and play my new songs. I had such fun on my last tour and I'm really excited about doing it again next year." Barclaycard ran a competition which gave fans the chance to win tickets to 6 May concert at Birmingham's National Indoor Arena.

Critics' reviews 

In a review for the Express & Star, Elizabeth Joyce said although Lewis was not like her contemporaries: "meat dress-wearing" Lady Gaga or the Russell Brand-marrying Katy Perry, "no one can reach those soft lows or soaring highs quite like her". Joyce praised the concert for showing the best of Lewis' vocal abilities. Focussing predominately on songs from Spirit (2007) and Glassheart (2012), the concert was largely acoustic music with a band and string quartet. In particular Joyce praised Lewis' performances of "First Time Ever I Saw Your Face" and "Bleeding Love" which earned her standing ovations, in addition to the "note perfect" rendition of "Run". Katherine Hollisey-McLean for the Worthing Herald largely agreed, commenting that if anyone expected Lewis to be "belting out song after song" they were right. Hollisey-McLean praised the decisions to switch the song arrangements, for example adding reggae beats to "Better in Time" and performing the acoustic version of "Trouble". She ended by saying that Lewis' vocals were "flawless" and that her stage presence and confidence had vastly improved over the last seven years.

The Guardians Malcolm Jack was less impressed; he stated that when Lewis tried to diversify the show by dancing or switching the arrangements, she risked becoming the British diva that pop music forgot. Jack said that during a "sassy dance routine" for "Forgive Me" Lewis came off as a "budget Beyoncé", whilst on the "cringey windin' and grindin' reggae take on 'Better in Time' song" she comes across like a "reasonably priced Rihanna". Jack concluded by saying the show was in need of a shot of "adrenaline". In writing for the Nottingham Post, Paul Hindle agreed, saying that when the tempo increased and choreography was introduced "Lewis looked endearingly uncomfortable"; however, Hindle was positive about Lewis' vocals, calling her vocal performance "virtuoso". He concluded that Lewis' "spellbinding rendition" of "Run" was a highlight of the concert, and that fans should not have left disappointed.

Set list 

The following set list is representative of the show in Berlin. It is not intended to represent the all shows throughout the tour.

"Come Alive"
"Fireflies"
"A Moment Like This" 
"Collide"
"Forgive Me"
"Better in Time" 
"Happy"
"Sugar"
"I to You"
"Broken"
"Trouble" 
"Locked Out of Heaven"
"Footprints in the Sand"
"The First Time Ever I Saw Your Face"
"Bleeding Love"
"Glassheart"
"Run"

Notes

Lewis performed "Diamonds" in Scarborough on 12 July 2013.

Shows

References 

2013 concert tours
Leona Lewis concert tours